The Ballad of Gregorio Cortez is a 1982 American Western film directed by Robert M. Young and starring Edward James Olmos as Gregorio Cortez.  It is based on the book With His Pistol in His Hand by Americo Paredes.

In 2022, the film was selected for preservation in the United States National Film Registry by the Library of Congress as being "culturally, historically or aesthetically significant."

Plot
Set in Belmont-Gonzales, Texas in 1901. After a misunderstanding, a Mexican-American farmer kills a sheriff. He eludes capture and becomes a folk hero. When eventually he is caught, he is tried seven times before finally being released, after twelve years in prison.

Cast

Reception and legacy
The review aggregation website Rotten Tomatoes reported a 100% approval rating with an average rating of 7.67/10 based on 6 reviews.

Janet Maslin of The New York Times said, "[The film] tells what sounds like a stirring story, and its plainness would seem to be an asset. But something more was needed here, if not in the way of fireworks then maybe just in verisimilitude. The events may be real, and even the settings are authentic; the courthouse in which Mr. Young filmed the trial scene is the one in which Mr. Cortez's trial actually took place. That's not the sort of authenticity that the film lacks. What it's missing is the spark, surprise and immediacy that might have made its principals feel like people, rather than key figures in a well-meaning historical pageant."

Accolades
Rosanna DeSoto won the Golden Eagle Award for Best Actress for her performance in the film.

Preservation
The Ballad of Gregorio Cortez was preserved by the Academy Film Archive in 2016.

See also
Latin American cinema
1982 in film
1983 in film

References

External links
 
 
 The Ballad of Gregorio Cortez: A Cinematic Corrido an essay by Charles Ramírez Berg at the Criterion Collection

1982 films
1980s English-language films
1980s Spanish-language films
American biographical films
American Western (genre) films
Films based on non-fiction books
Films directed by Robert M. Young
1982 Western (genre) films
American Playhouse
1982 multilingual films
American multilingual films
1980s American films
United States National Film Registry films